2018 Japan Open may refer to:
 2018 Japan Open (table tennis)
 2018 Japan Open (badminton)